Dongshan (Wade–Giles: Tung-shan; generally ) may refer to:

Places
Dongshan County, Fujian
Dongshan District, Hegang, Heilongjiang
Tung Shan (mountain), Hong Kong
Dongshan District, Tainan, Taiwan
, a subdistrict of Yuhua District, Changsha, Hunan
, a town in Huarong County, Hunan
, a Dong ethnic township in Suining County, Hunan
Dongshan, Yilan, township of Yilan County, Taiwan

Former districts
Dongshan District, Guangzhou, Guangdong
Dongshan District, Ürümqi, Xinjiang

People
Dongshan Liangjie, a 9th-century Chinese Chan teacher
Dongshan Shouchu, a 10th-century Chinese Chan teacher

See also

 Shandong (disambiguation)
 Dong (disambiguation)
 Shan (disambiguation)
 Tung Shan (disambiguation)